José Cartas (born 19 September 1951) is a Mexican hurdler. He competed in the men's 110 metres hurdles at the 1976 Summer Olympics.

References

1951 births
Living people
Athletes (track and field) at the 1975 Pan American Games
Athletes (track and field) at the 1976 Summer Olympics
Mexican male hurdlers
Olympic athletes of Mexico
Place of birth missing (living people)
Pan American Games competitors for Mexico